Clayton High School is a public high school in Clayton, Missouri.

History
The first Clayton High School classes met in the upper floors of the Forsyth School beginning in 1908. In 1911, the school graduated its first class. Designed by William B. Ittner, the first Clayton High School building opened in September 1917 at 7500 Maryland Avenue. The building, which cost slightly less than $111,000 to construct and $14,000 to partially equip, included six main classrooms and a large study hall–library. The building also featured a chemistry, biology and physics laboratories, an art room, a music room, and several vocational and technical classrooms. The school also included a combined gymnasium and 700-seat auditorium. By the 1940s, however, the building was overcrowded, and the district considered multiple options for its replacement.

Although planned to open in 1948, postwar supply shortages delayed the construction of a new building until the early 1950s. In 1952, the school building was sold to the department store chain Famous-Barr, and the school was demolished for the store parking lot. The new building opened in 1954 at 1 Mark Twain Circle, and the first class graduated in 1955. At the start of the schools 1954 opening, the school's entrance featured a six-foot diameter granite globe sculpture weighing nearly ten tons. A block of ice was used to help set the globe in place.

Accolades
Clayton has been ranked among the top public high schools by Newsweek and has won national and state-level awards for quality. For the 1983–1984 school year, Clayton was nominated by the Missouri Department of Elementary and Secondary Education for the United States Department of Education Blue Ribbon school program; for the following year its nomination was accepted and it became nationally recognized. It was again named a Missouri Gold Star school in 1994–1995 and was nominated for the Blue Ribbon school program. 

In 2011, Newsweek ranked Clayton as the 89th-best public high school in the United States, which was the highest in the state of Missouri. Newsweek again ranked Clayton in 2012; its ranking was 129 of the top 1,000 schools. 

When Clayton sophomores participated in the Programme for International Student Assessment (PISA) in 2009, the school's average scores in science and reading were higher than the averages of all other participating countries, including the United States; its average score was second-highest as compared to participating countries in mathematics.

Current status

Academics
Clayton has a relatively low dropout rate and a high graduation rate; for the 2010–2011 school year, fewer than 1 percent of students dropped out compared to the Missouri state dropout rate of 3.4 percent. Since the passage of No Child Left Behind in 2001, Clayton met the requirements for adequate yearly progress in communication arts in 2004, 2006, and from 2009 through 2011, and in mathematics from 2006 through 2010.

Activities
For the 2011–2012 school year, the school offered 27 activities approved by the Missouri State High School Activities Association (MSHSAA): baseball, boys and girls basketball, cheerleading, boys and girls cross country, dance team, field hockey, football, boys and girls golf, girls lacrosse, band and orchestra, scholar bowl, boys and girls soccer, softball, speech and debate, boys and girls swimming and diving, boys and girls tennis, boys and girls track and field, girls volleyball, water polo, and wrestling. 

In addition to its current activities, Clayton students have won multiple state championships, including:
Football: 2004
Girls Tennis: 1985
Boys Outdoor Track and Field: 1934, 1935
Boys Indoor Track and Field: 1934, 1935, 1936
Scholar Bowl: 2022

The Globe
The Globe, Clayton's student-run publication, is a forty-eight page, full-color newsmagazine. The Globe is a member of the National Scholastic Press Association's Hall of Fame, as well as a winner of the Missouri Interscholastic Press Association's All-Missouri designation, Quill and Scroll's Gallup Award, Columbia Scholastic Press Association's Gold and Silver Crown, and NSPA's Pacemaker. The Globe is a national Top 100 publication as recognized by the National Scholastic Press Association. Staff members have been recipients of two Brasler Prizes (scholastic equivalent of the Pulitzer) and three Robert F. Kennedy Human Rights Award.

Alumni
 Andy Cohen, 1986, TV show host/personality, RHO and WWHL on Bravo
 Jairus Byrd, 2005, NFL Pro Bowl Safety, Buffalo Bills
 Erin Daniels, 1991, actress
 Marc Elliot, 2004, motivational speaker, author, and member of NXIVM
 Jo Firestone, ca. 2005, comedian and actor
 Scott Foley, actor (Felicity, The Unit)
 Derrick Frost, 1999, NFL punter
 Rocco Landesman, 1965, award-winning Broadway producer
 Ryan McAdams, 2000, Fulbright Scholar and accomplished conductor
 Robert Stuart Nathan, 1966, television producer
 Peter Palmer, actor
 Louise Post, 1985, lead singer of the rock band Veruca Salt
 Claire Saffitz, 2005, pastry chef and host of Bon Appétit cooking show Gourmet Makes
 Kathryn Sansone, 1980, personal trainer and author
 Louis Susman, 1955, Ambassador to the Court of St. James (England) 2009–2013
 Nicholas Worth, 1956, character actor
 Sid Wyman, 1927, gambler, and Las Vegas casino owner
 Jake Zimmerman, 1992, St. Louis County Assessor

References

High schools in St. Louis County, Missouri
Educational institutions established in 1908
School buildings completed in 1954
Public high schools in Missouri
1908 establishments in Missouri